Anshel Brusilow (14 August 1928 – 15 January 2018) was an American violinist, conductor, and music educator at the collegiate level.

Extant discography

As violinist 

Philadelphia Orchestra

Bournemouth Symphony Orchestra

Selected compilations; as violinist

As conductor 

Chamber Symphony of Philadelphia

As violinist in an ensemble

Notes and references

Notes

References 

Discographies of American artists
Discographies of classical conductors